Alejandro Cabrera (born 30 September 1992) is an Argentine professional footballer who plays as a midfielder for Banfield.

Career
Cabrera started out, aged four, with Atlético Almafuerte. A move to Argentino Colonial followed, before he spent three years with Talleres. After leaving them, he had a stint with Deportivo Atalaya. He started his senior career in Liga Riotercerense with Argentino Colonial, who he joined in 2007; having almost quit football. Four years later, Cabrera signed for Club Roncedo of Liga Rió primero. July 2016 saw Cabrera join Torneo Federal B side Estudiantes. They won promotion in his first season, as he appeared nineteen times. Fifty-three appearances followed in Torneo Federal A, which culminated with promotion in 2018–19.

Cabrera scored goals for Estudiantes against Independiente Rivadavia and Ferro Carril Oeste in the second tier in 2019–20. In August 2020, Cabrera moved up to the Primera División with Banfield; penning a loan contract until December 2021 with a purchase option. He made his top-flight debut at the Estadio Monumental Antonio Vespucio Liberti against River Plate on 3 November; replacing Giuliano Galoppo for the final sixteen minutes of a 3–1 victory.

On 26 December 2021 Banfield confirmed, that the club had triggered the purchase option and signed Cabrera on a permanently deal until the end of 2024.

Career statistics
.

Notes

References

External links

1992 births
Living people
Sportspeople from Córdoba Province, Argentina
Argentine footballers
Association football midfielders
Torneo Federal A players
Primera Nacional players
Estudiantes de Río Cuarto footballers
Club Atlético Banfield footballers